"Tom Pillibi" is a song written in French by Pierre Cour, composed by André Popp and performed in 1960 by Jacqueline Boyer as 's entry and the winner of the Eurovision Song Contest 1960, gaining other versions including covers by other Eurovision entrants and by Hollywood star Julie Andrews. It was released as a single on 10 April 1960.

Original and cover lyrics
The song is a moderately up-tempo number, with the singer talking about her lover – the title character. She describes his material wealth - two castles, ships, other women wanting to be with him. She then admits that he has "only one fault", that being that he is "such a liar" and that none of what she had previously said about him was true. Nonetheless, she sings, she still loves him.

In what would become increasingly the norm over Contest history, the English version of the song, while still about the same man, conveyed quite a different impression. In this version, Tom is a compulsive womaniser and not to be trusted at all. Perhaps as a result of this, Des Mangan's book on Contest history confuses the issue further by describing the song as being about "a man with two castles and two boats and who's generally a right bastard, but she still loves him anyway." Boyer also recorded a German-language version of the song, under the same title.

Eurovision Song Contest
The song was performed thirteenth on the night, following 's Renato Rascel with "Romantica". At the close of voting, it had received 32 points, placing 1st in a field of 13.

The song is noted as the first Eurovision winner to be performed last, reviewed by entertainment website Screen Rant as an initial prove that a bias for recency "might just be at play in Eurovision".

It was succeeded as French representative that year by Jean-Paul Mauric with "Printemps, avril carillonne".

Cover versions
"Tom Pillibi" gained several recordings by internationally known and national well-established figures, including other Eurovision representatives, on the same year of the original release. Numerous accolades receiver, actress and singer Julie Andrews, recorded the song in English in April 1960. Laila Kinnunen, one of Finland's most popular singers and the country's 1961 Eurovision debutante, recorded a Finish version on 14 June 1960, as well as Sweden's 1962 Eurovision representative Inger Berggren.

References

External links
 Official Eurovision Song Contest site, history by year, 1960
 Detailed info & lyrics, The Diggiloo Thrush, "Tom Pillibi".

Eurovision songs of France
Eurovision songs of 1960
French-language songs
Eurovision Song Contest winning songs
Songs written by Pierre Cour
Songs written by André Popp
Columbia Graphophone Company singles
1960 songs